Thierry Laurey (born 17 February 1964) is a French professional football manager and former player who played as a defender and midfielder. He is the manager of Ligue 2 club Paris FC.

Laurey had one international cap for France against Scotland at Hampden Park in a March 1989 qualifier for the 1990 FIFA World Cup.

Managerial career
Laurey was sacked from Amiens following relegation and replaced by Serge Romano.

In 2011, he became the manager of Arles-Avignon. The following year he joined Gazélec Ajaccio for a three-year stint, before taking on his current role.

In 2017, Laurey guided Strasbourg back to Ligue 1 after a nine-year absence by winning the Ligue 2 championship.

In March 2019, he took Strasbourg to its fourth Coupe de la Ligue final, in which they faced Guingamp and won their fourth Coupe de la Ligue title, their first since 2005. He left the club in May 2021.

On 20 June 2021, Laurey was appointed as head coach of Ligue 2 side Paris FC, on a two-year contract.

Managerial statistics

Honours

Player
Marseille
Division 1 runner-up: 1986–87
Coupe de France runner-up: 1986–87

Montpellier
Coupe de France runner-up: 1993–94
Coupe d'Été runner-up: 1994

Manager
Strasbourg
Ligue 2: 2016–17
Coupe de la Ligue: 2018–19

References

External links
 

Thierry Laurey at PlanetePSG.com 

1964 births
Living people
Sportspeople from Troyes
Footballers from Grand Est
French footballers
France international footballers
Association football defenders
Association football midfielders
Valenciennes FC players
Olympique de Marseille players
Montpellier HSC players
FC Sochaux-Montbéliard players
Paris Saint-Germain F.C. players
AS Saint-Étienne players
Ligue 1 players
Ligue 2 players
French football managers
Ligue 1 managers
Ligue 2 managers
FC Sète 34 managers
AC Arlésien managers
Amiens SC managers
RC Strasbourg Alsace managers
Paris FC managers